Hugh Fraser (born 14 July 1957) is an Appeals Court justice at the Supreme Court of Queensland. He graduated from the law program at University of Queensland in 1979. He is a past president of the Bar Association of Queensland.

References

Judges of the Supreme Court of Queensland
Living people
1957 births